This is a list of the National Register of Historic Places listings in Arches National Park.

This is intended to be a complete list of the properties and districts on the National Register of Historic Places in Arches National Park, Utah, United States.  The locations of National Register properties and districts for which the latitude and longitude coordinates are included below, may be seen in a Google map.

There are six properties and districts listed on the National Register in the park.

Current listings 

|}

See also 
 National Register of Historic Places listings in Grand County, Utah
 National Register of Historic Places listings in Utah

References 
Mehls, Steven F. and Mehls, Carol Drake. National Register of Historic Places Registration Form: Arches National Park Multiple Resource. National Park Service February 15, 1988 

Arches